The Suicide Machines / Potshot is a 2003 split EP album by American punk rock band The Suicide Machines and Japanese J-ska band Potshot.

Track listing
Songs performed by Potshot
 "Endless Future" – 2:25
 "Islands" (Suicide Machines cover) – 2:12

Songs performed by The Suicide Machines
 "High Anxiety" – 2:04
 "Smile" (Potshot cover) – 2:09

Split EPs
2008 EPs